Richard Craig Shelby (born May 6, 1934) is an American lawyer and politician who served as a United States senator from Alabama from 1987 to 2023. First elected to the U.S. Senate in 1986 as a Democrat who later switched to the Republican Party in 1994, he chaired the Senate Appropriations Committee from 2018 to 2021. He previously chaired the Senate Intelligence Committee, the Senate Banking Committee, and the Senate Rules Committee. He was the longest-serving U.S. senator from Alabama, surpassing John Sparkman's record in March 2019.

Born in Birmingham, Alabama, Shelby received his law degree from the Birmingham School of Law in 1961. He went on to serve as city prosecutor from 1963 to 1971. During this period he worked as a U.S. magistrate for the Northern District of Alabama (1966–1970) and Special Assistant Attorney General of Alabama (1969–1971). He won a seat in the Alabama Senate in 1970. In 1978, he was elected from the 7th district to the United States House of Representatives, where he was among a group of conservative Democrats known as the boll weevils.

In 1986, Shelby won a tight race as a Democrat for the U.S. Senate. In 1994, the day after the Republican Revolution in which the GOP gained the majority in Congress midway through President Bill Clinton's first term, Shelby switched parties and became a Republican. He was reelected by a large margin in 1998, facing no significant electoral opposition thereafter. He was the dean of Alabama's congressional delegation.

In February 2021, Shelby announced that he would not seek reelection in 2022. Katie Britt, his former chief of staff, won the election to succeed him.

Due to his party switch, Shelby is the last Democrat to have held or won election to Alabama's Class 3 Senate seat.

Early life and education
Shelby was born in Birmingham, Alabama, the son of Alice L. (née Skinner) and Ozie Houston Shelby. He graduated in 1953 from Hueytown High School in Hueytown, Alabama, then the University of Alabama, receiving an undergraduate degree in 1957.  He was admitted to the Alabama State Bar on August 29, 1961. He received an LL.B. from the University of Alabama School of Law in 1963.

Early career 
Shelby is a member of the American Bar Association, the Alabama State Bar, the American Judicature Society, Alabama Law Institute, Delta Chi fraternity, and Phi Alpha Delta legal fraternity.

Shelby was a city prosecutor in Tuscaloosa, Alabama, from 1963 to 1971. From 1966 to 1970, he was a U.S. Magistrate for the Northern District of Alabama; from 1969 to 1971, he was a special assistant state attorney general.
Shelby was elected to the Alabama Senate in 1970 and served until 1978. That year he was elected to the U.S. House of Representatives from the Tuscaloosa-based 7th district upon Walter Flowers's retirement. He was reelected three times. Shelby was one of the more conservative Democrats in Congress, and a member of the boll weevils, a group of moderate to conservative-leaning Democrats who often worked with President Ronald Reagan on defense issues.

U.S. Senate

Elections

1986

In the 1986 U.S. Senate election in Alabama, Shelby narrowly won the Democratic nomination for the Senate seat held by Republican Jeremiah Denton, the first Republican elected to the Senate from Alabama since Reconstruction. He won a very close race as the Democrats regained control of the Senate.

1992

Shelby was easily reelected even as Bill Clinton lost Alabama's electoral votes.

1998

On November 9, 1994, Shelby switched his party affiliation to Republican, one day after the Republican Revolution in which Republicans won control of both houses in the midterm elections, giving them a 53–47 majority in the Senate. He won his first full term as a Republican in 1998 by a large margin.

2004

He faced no significant opposition in 2004.

2010

He faced no significant opposition and was reelected to a fifth term.

2016

He was reelected to a sixth term.

A September 2009 poll showed Shelby had a 58% approval rating, with 35% disapproving.

In 2014, The Wall Street Journal criticized Shelby for hoarding campaign and PAC contributions and not sharing them with colleagues.

Tenure

1980s
In 1987, Shelby opposed Reagan's nomination of Robert Bork to the Supreme Court, a move attributed to lobbying by Alabama African-American leaders who reminded Shelby that he had relied on support from black voters in narrowly defeating Denton in 1986. In 1991, Shelby supported President George H. W. Bush's conservative Supreme Court nominee Clarence Thomas.

1990s
In 1991, Shelby sponsored legislation granting federal recognition to the MOWA Band of Choctaw Indians. Though confident it would pass, Shelby stressed the "need to get more documentation regarding establishment of their tribal identity." The Senate Select Committee on Indian Affairs voted 11 to 2 in favor of the legislation on July 18.

Shelby publicly feuded with President Bill Clinton during the first half of Clinton's first term. At a meeting with Vice President Al Gore, he turned to the TV cameras and denounced the Clinton program as "high on taxes, low on [spending] cuts".

Shelby served on the Senate Select Committee on Intelligence from 1995 to 2003, stepping down because of a Senate rule limiting committee terms to eight years. He took an adversarial stance toward the intelligence community during both the Clinton and Bush administrations. He helped sink Anthony Lake's nomination as CIA director in 1997 and promised to investigate the use of American-made satellites by the Chinese to gather intelligence. Shelby took a hard line on leaks of classified information. In 2000 he introduced a bill, vetoed by Clinton, "that would have broadened the law that criminalizes release of national defense information." According to The Washington Post:

Civil liberties groups and news organizations, which argued that the legislation would chill their ability to get information from officials, lobbied for the veto. ...In 2002, with George W. Bush in the White House, Shelby reintroduced his language, but then-Attorney General John D. Ashcroft said that "rigorous investigation" and enforcement of existing laws—not new legislation—were the best way to fight leaks.

In 1991, Shelby supported the Crime Bill S.1241 sponsored by Senator Joseph Biden that instituted a national waiting period for handgun purchases as well as a federal ban on semi-automatic firearms.

In January 1992, Shelby met with Chair of the Federal Reserve Alan Greenspan, advocating that the basic cost of money be reduced from 3.5% to 3% to stimulate the economy. He confirmed afterward that he intended to vote for Greenspan for another term as Federal Reserve Chair and said that Greenspan was not opposed to his suggestion to cut the discount rate to its lowest in 20 years in addition to agreeing with him on the need for a restoration of investment tax credits and a special tax rate for capital gains along with the providing of incentives to encourage savings.

In 1992, Shelby's aide Tom Barnes was murdered in a hold-up robbery. In response, Shelby supported the reinstatement of the death penalty in D.C.

In 1999, Shelby opposed the Gramm–Leach–Bliley Act, which repealed parts of the Glass–Steagall Legislation, and was the only Republican senator and one of eight senators overall to vote against it.

On February 12, 1999, Shelby was one of 50 senators to vote to convict and remove Bill Clinton from office.

2000s
Shelby was highly critical of CIA Director George Tenet in the aftermath of the September 11 attacks. From 2003 until 2007, he chaired the Senate Committee on Banking, Housing and Urban Affairs. As of 2022, he is a member of the Appropriations Committee and chaired its subcommittee on Commerce, Justice and Science and was formerly a member of the Special Committee on Aging. He lost his chairmanships in 2007 when Democrats regained control of the Senate.

In 2004, a federal investigation concluded that Shelby revealed classified information to the media while a member of the Senate Intelligence Committee. Specifically, he revealed classified information on June 19, 2002, to Carl Cameron, the chief political correspondent on Fox News. The information consisted of two messages between Al-Qaeda operatives intercepted by the National Security Agency on September 10, 2001, but not translated until the day after the attacks—"the match is about to begin" and "tomorrow is zero hour." The Department of Justice declined to file criminal charges against Shelby and transferred the case to the Senate Ethics Committee. In 2005 the committee concluded its probe into the leak.

As chair of the Senate Committee on Banking, Housing, & Urban Affairs, Shelby opposed legislation that would have permitted additional competition in the title insurance industry.

Shelby co-chairs the Congressional Privacy Caucus and Zero Capital Gains Tax Caucus. He is also the Senate co-chair of the National Security Caucus and a member of the National Republican Senatorial Committee and the Senate Centrist Coalition.

In March 2009, as the Obama administration was expected to reverse limits on embryonic stem-cell research imposed by the Bush administration, Shelby said, "My basic tenet here is I don't think we should create life to enhance life and to do research and so forth. I know that people argue there are other ways. I think we should continue our biomedical research everywhere we can, but we should have some ethics about it." Later that month, he was one of 14 senators to vote against a procedural move that essentially guaranteed a major expansion of a national service corps. The Congressional Budget Office estimated the bill's cost for the fiscal year 2010 of $418 million and around $5.7 billion for 2010 through 2014.

In February 2010, Shelby placed a hold on more than 70 of Obama's nominees to various government posts, in a protest over an Air Force KC-135 Stratotanker contract and the FBI's Terrorist Explosive Device Analytical Center. He lifted all but three of the holds three days later, saying, "The purpose of placing numerous holds was to get the White House's attention on two issues that are critical to our national security—the Air Force's aerial refueling tanker acquisition and the FBI's Terrorist Device Analytical Center (TEDAC). With that accomplished, Sen. Shelby has decided to release his holds on all but a few nominees directly related to the Air Force tanker acquisition until the new Request for Proposal is issued." White House spokesman Robert Gibbs criticized Shelby for "hold[ing] up qualified nominees for positions that are needed because he didn't get two earmarks"; Shelby denied the holds were over earmarks.

2010s
Shelby's high campaign contribution spending has been criticized; from 2008 until 2014 he had reimbursed himself and his wife more than $500,000 from his campaign and leadership PACs. The Wall Street Journal called him a "stingy lawmaker".

In May 2011, Shelby was one of five Republicans to vote against a Republican bill expanding offshore oil and gas drilling in U.S. coastal waters and requiring the Interior Department to complete multiple offshore lease sales in the Gulf of Mexico and off the coasts of Virginia and Alaska.

In March 2015, Shelby announced the Senate Banking, Housing, and Urban Affairs Committee would "review proposals aimed at providing greater clarity in Fed decision-making and at reforming the composition of Federal Reserve System" and that he had asked for input from the original regional reserve bank presidents for the Federal Reserve.

In March 2017, Shelby called Supreme Court nominee Neil Gorsuch "an outstanding nominee” and said that Republicans should abolish the filibuster for Supreme Court nominees if Democrats blocked his appointment, arguing that that party used the "nuclear option" first.

In December 2017, after Senate Judiciary Committee Chairman Chuck Grassley issued a statement requesting that the nomination of Brett Talley for federal judge in Alabama be withdrawn, a spokesman for Shelby said that Shelby considered Talley "a great young attorney" and had spoken with him the previous week while asking "for his letter of withdrawal in hopes that Mr. Talley can gain more experience."

In August 2018, after Rand Paul proposed an amendment to tie a spending bill to the funding of Planned Parenthood, Shelby warned that the amendment could attract supporters while becoming a spoiler for a larger government spending bill.

In September 2018, Shelby reported that the House and Senate were close to a deal on a third package of spending bills for 2019. Representative Nita Lowey disputed the claim, saying that she did not believe a deal would be reached until after the House adjourned and a House Republican aide responded that there was no time to complete the package.

In November 2018, Shelby, Senators Mitch McConnell, and John Thune met with President Trump at the White House, Shelby stating after the meeting that he told Trump the Republicans should avoid a partial government shutdown over Trump's wishes for a border wall and that he was unsure whether Trump's position was affected by his comments.

In February 2019, after Trump delivered the 2019 State of the Union Address, Shelby called it a reiteration of Trump's support for the U.S.-Mexico border wall and confirmed an interaction with House Appropriations Committee chair Nita Lowey, a leading Democratic negotiator.

2020s
In September 2020, with less than two months left in the presidential election, Shelby supported an immediate Senate vote on Trump's nominee to fill the Supreme Court vacancy caused by Justice Ruth Bader Ginsburg's death. Yet in March 2016, Shelby refused to consider Obama's Supreme Court nominee, saying the "decision should be made after the upcoming presidential election so that the American people have a voice."

During the January 6 United States Capitol attack, Shelby called for law and order via Twitter. When Congress reconvened to certify the 2021 United States Electoral College vote count, Shelby voted to accept the results of the election. On February 13, 2021, Shelby voted to acquit Trump of inciting the Capitol attack.

In August 2021, Shelby prevented an attempt to limit cryptocurrency tax-reporting requirements in the Senate infrastructure bill.

Committee assignments

 Senate Committee on Appropriations (ranking member)
 Subcommittee on Commerce, Justice and Science
 Subcommittee on Defense (vice chair)
 Subcommittee on Energy and Water Development
 Subcommittee on Homeland Security
 Subcommittee on Labor, Health and Human Services, Education & Related Agencies
 Subcommittee on Transportation, Housing and Urban Development, and Related Agencies
 Senate Committee on Banking, Housing & Urban Affairs (former chair)
 Senate Committee on Rules and Administration (former chair)
 Joint Committee of Congress on the Library (vice chair)

Caucus memberships
Senate Republican Conference

Political positions
Shelby has a lifetime ideology score of 77.43 from the politically conservative American Conservative Union's Center for Legislative Accountability. The politically liberal Americans for Democratic Action gave him a score of zero in their 2019 report.

Abortion
Shelby opposes abortion and said on his Senate campaign website that Roe v. Wade is "terribly flawed on both a constitutional and moral basis." He also opposes taxpayer funding of Planned Parenthood and voted against a short-term funding bill in Congress because it did not defund Planned Parenthood. When Roe v. Wade was overturned in June 2022, Shelby called it "welcome news" and said, "It is our moral and ethical duty to protect the dignity of human life, particularly when it comes to the unborn."

Budget and economy
Both during the George W. Bush administration, in 2008, and the Obama administration, in 2009, Shelby was vocal in his opposition to bailing out banks and other corporations (such as AIG).

In 2010, Shelby initially opposed the Republican Party's moratorium on earmark funding. The same year, he voted to block three amendments to regulate banks, including an amendment #3812 to S. 3217 to cap ATM fees at $0.50 per transaction and to bar banks borrowing taxpayer money through TARP funds to use those funds for their own benefit.

In 2011, Shelby opposed the nomination of Nobel Economics Prize laureate and Massachusetts Institute of Technology professor Peter Diamond to the board of the Federal Reserve on the grounds that Diamond "lacked the necessary qualifications". Since becoming Senate Banking chair, Shelby has made "regulatory relief and financial regulation reform his top priority". In May 2015, he revealed the so-called Shelby Bill, easing regulatory restrictions on smaller banks and increasing scrutiny of the Federal Reserve.

In May 2015, Shelby introduced legislation that if enacted would increase congressional scrutiny of the Federal Reserve and ease some regulatory burdens on multiple small banks and loosen oversight to banks such as U.S. Bancorp and SunTrust Banks enacted under the Dodd-Frank Act. In a written statement, he called the legislation "a working document intended to initiate a conversation with all members of the committee who are interested in reaching a bipartisan agreement to improve access to credit and to reduce the level of risk in our financial system."

Civil rights
Shelby voted to make English the sole language of the federal government.

He voted for the Federal Marriage Amendment.

Shelby has a 0% rating from the ACLU for the 116th Congress. He has a 4% rating from the ACLU for the 115th Congress (2017–19).

Bill Clinton
In 1993, Shelby, still a Democrat at the time, was one of six Democratic senators to vote against the Omnibus Budget Reconciliation Act of 1993.

In 1999, Shelby was one of ten Republican senators to vote to acquit President Bill Clinton on the charge of perjury when Clinton was tried in the Senate in 1999, but he voted to convict Clinton of obstruction of justice.

Foreign policy

Iran
In December 2002, Shelby said, "We don't need another nuclear power -- not with Iran sponsoring terrorism that it has in the past. The fact that they are seemingly pursuing an avenue to build nuclear weapons should be disturbing to everybody."

In March 2015, Shelby was one of 47 Republican senators to sign a letter to Iran warning that a nuclear deal with the U.S. would have to first be approved by Congress. In July, he called the Joint Comprehensive Plan of Action "a bad deal" and questioned why the U.S. would support the agreement if Russia President Vladimir Putin favored it.

In September 2016, Shelby was one of 34 senators to sign a letter to United States Secretary of State John Kerry advocating that the U.S. use "all available tools to dissuade Russia from continuing its airstrikes in Syria" from an Iranian airbase near Hamadan "that are clearly not in our interest" and stating that the US should enforce the airstrikes' violation of "a legally binding Security Council Resolution" on Iran.

Russia
In December 2010, Shelby was one of 26 senators to vote against the ratification of New Start, a nuclear arms reduction treaty between the U.S. and the Russian Federation obliging both countries to have no more than 1,550 strategic warheads as well as 700 launchers deployed during the next seven years along with providing a continuation of on-site inspections that halted when START I expired the previous year. It was the first arms treaty with Russia in eight years. In January 2021, Shelby voted for Senate measure S.3436, which would impose sanctions on operators of the Nord Stream pipeline. Democrats blocked the measure.

Saudi Arabia
In March 2018, Shelby voted to table a resolution spearheaded by Bernie Sanders, Chris Murphy, and Mike Lee that would have required Trump to withdraw American troops either in or influencing Yemen in the next 30 days unless they were combating Al-Qaeda.

Gun law

Shelby has an A+ rating from the National Rifle Association for his support of gun rights. In 2016, he voted against the Feinstein Amendment, which sought to stop the sale of firearms to people known or suspected to be terrorists. Asked by Scott Wapner why he voted against it, Shelby said, "I do believe that we should keep guns out of the hands of terrorists, would-be terrorists, and a lot of other people."

In January 2019, Shelby was one of 31 Republican senators to cosponsor the Constitutional Concealed Carry Reciprocity Act, a bill introduced by John Cornyn and Ted Cruz that would grant individuals with concealed carry privileges in their home state the right to exercise this right in any other state with concealed carry laws while concurrently abiding by that state’s laws.

Health care
Shelby opposed Obama's health reform legislation, voting against the Patient Protection and Affordable Care Act in December 2009 and against the Health Care and Education Reconciliation Act of 2010.

In August 2009, Shelby opined that the United States had "the best health care system in the world" and cited the need to expand the system without destroying it.

After Senator Ted Cruz's 21-hour speech opposing the Affordable Care Act, Shelby joined Cruz and 17 other senators in a failed vote against cloture on a comprehensive government funding bill that would also have continued funding healthcare reform.

In September 2017, after the Senate reached an agreement during a lunch not to vote on a Republican bill to repeal the Affordable Care Act that week, Shelby said, "Why have a vote if you know what the outcome is and it's not what you want? I don't know what you gain from that. But I do believe that the health care issue is not dead, and that's what counts."

Immigration
Shelby voted for a 1994 moratorium on certain forms of immigration.

Space
Shelby has supported development of the Space Launch System (SLS), but disagreed with how funds for the program have been spent. In 2011 he favored competition for the strap-on booster design. The SLS earmark has been opposed by fiscal conservative groups, including the Tea Party.

Taxes
Shelby supports a flat tax and supported the Bush Administration's tax cuts. He cites disagreements with Democrats on tax policy as one of the main reasons he became a Republican; he feels the Democrats are too willing to enact tax increases.

Shelby is a signer of Americans for Tax Reform's Taxpayer Protection Pledge.

Donald Trump

During the first impeachment trial of Donald Trump, Shelby opposed the introduction of new witnesses and voted to acquit.

During the second impeachment trial of Donald Trump, Shelby voted to acquit based on his belief that impeachment does not apply to former officials.

On May 28, 2021, Shelby abstained from voting on the creation of an independent commission to investigate the 2021 United States Capitol attack.

Buildings named after him 
 The Shelby Hall Research Center at the University of Alabama is named for Shelby and his wife, a professor emerita at the university. The  new center opened in 2007 and combines mathematics, chemistry and biology research in one building.
 The Richard C. and Annette N. Shelby Interdisciplinary Biomedical Research Building at the University of Alabama at Birmingham opened in April 2006.
 The Senator Richard C. and Dr. Annette N. Shelby Center for Engineering Technology, part of the Samuel Ginn College of Engineering at Auburn University, was dedicated on April 18, 2008. Shelby helped secure $30 million of the $54 million cost of Phase I of the project.
 In Mobile, Shelby Hall houses the University of South Alabama College of Engineering and School of Computer and Information Sciences. The  facility was named after Richard and Annette Shelby for their commitment to higher education in Alabama. Senator Shelby was instrumental for securing $40 million in federal grants to fund the $50 million project. The building was dedicated on September 9, 2012.
 The 207,000-square-foot Shelby Center for Science and Technology was dedicated at the University of Alabama in Huntsville in October 2007. It includes 18 teaching laboratories, 13 classrooms, 15 research laboratories, two teaching auditoriums, and 146 offices.
The Richard C. Shelby Atrium and Auditorium at Dauphin Island Sea Lab, a state-of-the-art video conferencing center, the first of its kind along the Gulf Coast, has earned the distinguished LEEDS certification for the reduction of negative environmental impact in construction practices and materials.
The Richard C. Shelby Center for Missile Intelligence serves as the headquarters of the Missile and Space Intelligence Center (MSIC), a component of the Defense Intelligence Agency in Huntsville, Alabama. Shelby has supported MSIC in the past.

Electoral history

Personal life
Shelby has been married to Annette Nevin Shelby for over 60 years; the couple have two sons, Richard Jr. and Claude. As of 2018, according to OpenSecrets.org, Shelby's net worth was more than $19 million.

See also
 List of American politicians who switched parties in office
 List of United States senators who switched parties

Explanatory notes

References

Further reading

External links

 Senator Richard Shelby official U.S. Senate website
 Richard Shelby for Senate
 
 
 Collected news and commentary  from Politico
 

|-

|-

|-

|-

|-

|-

|-

|-

|-

|-

|-

|-

 

|-

|-

1934 births
Living people
20th-century American politicians
21st-century American politicians
Alabama lawyers
Alabama Republicans
Alabama state senators
American Presbyterians
Birmingham School of Law alumni
Democratic Party members of the United States House of Representatives from Alabama
Democratic Party United States senators from Alabama
Hueytown High School alumni
Politicians from Birmingham, Alabama
Politicians from Tuscaloosa, Alabama
Republican Party United States senators from Alabama
University of Alabama School of Law alumni